Hullabaloo is an annual campus music festival at the University of California San Diego. It has been a part of the university's Founders' Celebration every November since 2011, when it was created to replace its predecessor, FallFest.

There was no festival in 2020.

Festival format 
Hullabaloo takes place in the University Center neighborhood of UC San Diego, just south of Price Center. Headliners perform on a stage erected in Town Square, with student organization booths and food trucks surrounding the square. The adjoining Matthews Quad is converted into a carnival area with four rides: the Kamikaze, the Zipper, the Round Up, and a zip line.

Past lineups 
 2011: Felix Cartal, Jokers of the Scene, DJ Philly, DJ Stu
 2012: The M Machine, XV, Chris Kutz
 2013: Chance the Rapper, Kennedy Jones, Ali, Jun
 2014: Logic, Erik Hassle, Conway, Avery
 2015: Lil Dicky, David Choi, The Young Wild
 2016: Isaiah Rashad, Andrew Luce, Tennyson
 2017: O.T. Genasis, courtship., Pham
2018: Saba, Vincent, Leland

References

External links 
 Official website
 AS Concerts & Events website

University of California, San Diego
Festivals in San Diego
Music festivals in California